Mark Duane Followill is an American sports announcer, currently for Fox Sports, covering basketball, soccer and football.

Career 
Early in his career, Followill worked in various positions at KTCK The Ticket in Dallas including as host of The Ender. He still makes regular contributions to the station. He also had a stint at KTOK in Oklahoma City.

Basketball 
Followill is the television play-by-play voice for the Dallas Mavericks, a position he's held since 2005. He and analyst Derek Harper won a Lone Star Emmy award in 2014 for their work on Mavericks broadcasts. Followill had previously been the radio play-by-play voice for the Mavericks on 103.3 ESPN Radio from 2001 to 2005. He won the Katie Award for Best Play-by-Play Sportscast in 2002 and the Texas Associated Press Award for Best Play-by-Play Broadcast in 2004 and 2005.

Soccer 
Followill is also the television play-by-play announcer for FC Dallas. In 2012, he began calling FCD games except when they conflicted with his responsibilities with the Mavericks. His work with FC Dallas gained the attention of Fox Sports, who named him as one of their announcers for Copa America Centenario. Later that summer, he was named as one of the announcers for NBC's coverage of soccer at the 2016 Summer Olympics. In 2017, Fox named him part of their team covering that year's CONCACAF Gold Cup. He has also called UEFA Europa League, Bundesliga, MLS, FIFA U-17 World Cup, and FIFA U-20 World Cup action for Fox. Followill was also an announcer for the 2018 FIFA World Cup.

Followill joined the broadcasting team for MLS Season Pass on Apple TV in 2023.

Football 
Followill also announces play-by-play action for college football telecasts for Fox Sports. Earlier in his career, he was the play-by-play announcer for the SMU football team.

Personal life 
Followill is a native of the Dallas–Fort Worth metroplex. He graduated from Northwest High School in Justin, Texas. He attended the University of North Texas, but left to pursue his broadcasting career. In 2020, after 3 years of resuming course work, Mark Followill graduated from North Texas with a Bachelor of Applied Arts and Sciences degree.

References

Living people
National Basketball Association broadcasters
Association football commentators
College football announcers
SMU Mustangs football announcers
High school football announcers in the United States
University of North Texas alumni
Olympic Games broadcasters
Year of birth missing (living people)